Zhangpu railway station is a railway station on the Xiamen–Shenzhen railway located in Zhangpu County, Fujian Province, China.

References 

Railway stations in Fujian